Mizarai is a meteorite impact crater in Druskininkai municipality, Lithuania. The crater is not exposed to the surface and the site now hosts Mizarai village. It was created by an asteroid, estimated  in diameter, 500 ± 20 or 570 ± 50 million years ago (Cambrian or Neoproterozoic). It was later buried under various sediments.

See also
 Vepriai crater

References

Impact craters of Lithuania
Cambrian impact craters
Tourist attractions in Alytus County
Druskininkai Municipality